Gurk may refer to:

 Gurk (river), in Austria
 Gurk, Carinthia, a town in Austria
 Eduard Gurk (1801–1841), Austrian painter
 Krka (Sava), a river in Slovenia
 Roman Catholic Diocese of Gurk, in Austria

See also 
 Krka (disambiguation)